The Copa do Brasil 2003 was the 15th staging of the Copa do Brasil. 

The competition started on 2 February and concluded on 4 June 2003 with the second leg of the final, held at the Mineirão Stadium in Belo Horizonte, in which Cruzeiro lifted the trophy for the fourth time with a 3-1 victory over Flamengo.

Nonato, of Bahia, with nine goals, was the competition's topscorer.

Format
The competition was contested by 65 clubs in a knock-out format where all rounds were played over two legs and the away goals rule was used, with the exception of the preliminary match, which was played in a single match, and in the first two rounds if the away team won the first leg with an advantage of at least two goals, the second leg was not played and the club automatically qualified to the next round.

Participating teams

Alegrense (ES)
América (RN)
Americano (RJ)
Anapolina (GO)
Atlético Cajazeirense (PB)
Atlético (MG)
Atlético (PR)
Bahia (BA)
Bangu (RJ)
Botafogo (PB)
Botafogo (RJ)
Caldense (MG)
Ceará (CE)
CENE (MS)
CFA (RO)
CFZ (DF)
Comercial (MS)
Confiança (SE)
Corinthians (AL)
Coríntians (RN)
Coritiba (PR)
Criciúma (SC)
CRB (AL)
Cruzeiro (MG)
Dom Bosco (MT)
Figueirense (SC)
Flamengo (PI)
Flamengo (RJ)
Fluminense (BA)
Fluminense (RJ)
Fortaleza (CE)
Gama (DF)
Goiás (GO)

Guarani/VA (RS)
Guarani (SP)
Juventude (RS)
Internacional (RS)
Ipatinga (MG)
Iraty (PR)
Itabaiana (SE)
Ituano (SP)
Moto Club (MA)
Nacional (AM)
Náutico (PE)
Operário (MT)
Palmeiras (SP)
Paraná (PR)
Pelotas (RS)
Remo (PA)
Rio Branco (AC)
Rio Branco (ES)
River (PI)
Roraima (RR)
Sampaio Corrêa (MA)
Santa Cruz (PE)
São Caetano (SP)
São Paulo (SP)
São Raimundo (AM)
Sport (PE)
Tocantinópolis (TO)
Tuna Luso (PA)
Vasco (RJ)
Vila Nova (GO)
Vitória (BA)
Ypiranga (AP)

Competition stages

Notes

References
 Copa do Brasil 2003 at RSSSF

2003 domestic association football cups
2003
2003 in Brazilian football